Mrs. & Mr. Sharma Allahabadwale is an Indian television series which was aired on SAB TV from 17 May 2010 to 27 January 2011. The show shares the comic spirit and journey of a small town family with the struggle of a middle-class family.

Plot
The show's story is based on mainly the two characters in the title. They live in Allahabad.

Mrs. & Mr. Sharma Allahabadwale celebrates the comic spirit and life of a small town. It is a story of the struggle of day-to-day incidents in the life of a middle-class family. It shows the clash of values and ethics between people of small towns and large cities. It frequently takes a humorous tone on the widespread corruption and double standards of big city life. The series shows the gap between two places — Allahabad and the vastly larger Mumbai.

Dristhdumn Sarveshwar Sharma is the head of the family. He is a simple man, contented with his family and job. He is grounded with his own set of beliefs and customs. Mr. Sharma accepts a transfer letter with a prospect of a better future. He goes to Mumbai. Comic dialogues and journey of a small town lead to humorous incidents.

Rashmi Sharma is a stereotyped, small city, middle-class Indian housewife. She has never seen a big city and has complete faith in her husband.

Cast
 Divyanka Tripathi Dahiya played the character of Rashmi Dristhdumn Sharma. She is a perfect housewife. She loves cooking for her husband. Mrs. Sharma feels her husband is the honest in the world.
 Rajesh Kumar  played the character of Dristhdumn Sarveshwar Sharma. He is a 35-year-old married man ingrained with all the values of a true Indian. He has a master's degree in Hindi literature. He works as an assistant bank manager. He gets happier than ever when he hears about his transfer from Allahabad to Mumbai. But he doesn't know about the real taste of the dream city. He is known as Mr. Sharma.<
 Vandana Pathak as Rajshri Shah
 Akruti Singh played the character of Raagini Sharma. She is the 19-year-old unmarried sister of Mr. Sharma. He always inspires her to become an actress one day.
 Pooja Sharma played the character of Kiran, sister of Mrs. Sharma.
 Dilip Kumar Sharma played Daboo. He is the 11-year-old son of Mr. Sharma. He is smart, well managed and expert in handling situations.
 Ashiesh Roy as Anna
 Shruti Vyas as Dolly, Anna's wife
 Sudha Chandran and Atul Srivastava are leading characters.
 Anang Desai as Sharma Boss
 Gaurav Chopra as Plumber
 Aanjjan Srivastav as Mr. Sharma

References

External links
 

Sony SAB original programming
Indian comedy television series
Indian television sitcoms
2011 Indian television series endings
2010 Indian television series debuts